The Foley Shield is a rugby league competition in North Queensland administered by the Queensland Rugby League.

Prior to 1948 an inter-town competition known as the Carlton Cup was contested in North Queensland. This was revamped, and renamed in honour of Arch Foley, a member of the 1918 Townsville representative team that travelled north to Cairns, and south throughout Central Queensland. He was a founding member of the Townsville Souths rugby league club, and with later Australian Prime Minister Arthur Fadden formed the North Queensland Rugby League in 1919.

In 1948 the competition was structured into a Northern Zone (Cairns, Babinda, Tully and Eacham) and a Southern Zone (Mackay, Ayr and Townsville). The following year, a Central Zone (Herbert River, Charters Towers and Home Hill) was added. The grand final was played in Townsville, and was a highlight of the rugby league calendar.

The Foley Shield continued to be held annually until the introduction of the statewide Queensland Cup competition in 1996. In 2000 the competition was reinstated, and was contested by Cairns, Mackay and Townsville.

In an attempt to re-invent the competition and renew the tradition and passion in the shield, Mount Isa, with the Mid-West league, (Mount Isa-Mid West) and Innisfail-Eacham returned to the competition and Cape York/Torres Strait joined the competition, and the Shield was played as a round robin at the Townsville Sports Reserve over the Easter weekend in 2009. In 2010, the competition was moved to the Labour Day Long Weekend, with a preliminary round played in regional centres over the Anzac Day Long Weekend.

In 2011, the competition moved to the 20th to 22 May to be played in Townsville, with no preliminary round played. Townsville will split into two zones, Townsville City and Townsville Country. This brings the Townsville district in line with their Juniors, who found the move successful. This has followed the lead of Cairns who split. into Cairns and Innisfail-Eacham. Also, the re-introduction of Bowen to the Foley Shield (Formerly part of Whitsunday) who will combine with Palm Island, who play a 7 team A-Grade Competition. They will be known as Bowen-Palm Island. Mount Isa-Mid West will be known as Northern Outback, and Cape-Torres will be known as Remote Areas Rugby League. (RARL)

Teams

Grand Final results
 1948: Babinda 7 defeated Ayr 2
 1949: Townsville 22 defeated Cairns 13
 1950: Ayr 23 defeated Cairns 15
 1951: Babinda 19 defeated Ayr 15
 1952: Herbert River 15 defeated Babinda 4
 1953: Cairns 18 defeated Townsville 15
 1954: Ayr 18 defeated Cairns 12
 1955: Cairns 26 defeated Townsville 17
 1956: Townsville 23 defeated Cairns 16
 1957: Townsville 38 defeated Cairns 15
 1958: Cairns 29 defeated Townsville 15
 1959: Mackay 29 defeated Cairns 18
 1960: Innisfail 12 defeated Herbert River 9
 1961: Eacham 35 defeated Mackay 10
 1962: Townsville 8 defeated Eacham 3
 1963: Tully 29 defeated Burdekin 15
 1964: Innisfail 30 defeated Townsville 8
 1965: Herbert River 14 defeated Cairns 7
 1966: Cairns 14 defeated Townsville 10
 1967: Townsville 16 defeated Innisfail 15
 1968: Innisfail 22 defeated Mackay 12
 1969: Mount Isa 12 defeated Townsville 9
 1970: Cairns 12 defeated Townsville 9
 1971: Cairns 37 defeated Whitsunday 6
 1972: Mount Isa 19 defeated Innisfail 16
 1973: Whitsunday 19 defeated Innisfail 16
 1974: Cairns 12 defeated Mount Isa 6
 1975: Innisfail 15 defeated Townsville 4
 1976: Cairns 11 defeated Townsville 10
 1977: Mount Isa 18 defeated Innisfail 16
 1978: Mount Isa 15 defeated Mackay 12
 1979: Mount Isa 26 defeated Townsville 6
 1980: Herbert River 18 defeated Burdekin 13
 1981: Mount Isa 13 defeated Innisfail 9
 1982: Townsville 25 drew with Herbert River 25 (both teams were declared joint winners after the scores were tied after extra time)
 1983: Mount Isa 22 defeated Townsville 10
 1984: Mackay 21 defeated Mount Isa 4
 1985: Mount Isa 26 defeated Burdekin 2
 1986: Cairns 36 defeated Townsville 34
 1987: Townsville 30 defeated Cairns 26
 1988: Mount Isa 22 defeated Mackay 18
 1989: Innisfail-Eacham 40 defeated Mackay 12
 1990: Innisfail-Eacham 28 defeated Cairns 14
 1991: Mackay 30 defeated Cairns 22
 1992: Mackay 31 defeated Mount Isa 12
 1993: Cairns 30 defeated Mackay 24
 1994: Mackay 22 defeated Cairns 6
 1995: Cairns 34 defeated Mackay 24
 2000: Townsville 40 defeated Mackay 16
 2001: Townsville 28 defeated Cairns 24
 2002: Townsville 28 defeated Cairns 22
 2003: Townsville 28 defeated Cairns 26
 2004: Mackay 44 defeated Cairns 28
 2005: Cairns 36 defeated Mackay 32
 2006: Cairns 24 defeated Townsville 22
 2007: Townsville 14 defeated Cairns 4
 2008: Cairns 30 defeated Townsville 28
 2009: Innisfail-Eacham 32 defeated Cape-Torres 22
 2010: Townsville 48 defeated Mount Isa-Mid West 12
 2011: Mackay 30 defeated Townsville City 14

Sources

History
 Rleague.com World of Rugby League Queensland website
 World of Rugby League Forums
 RL1908 website
 North Queensland Cowboys website
 Foley Shield Website

Results
 "Stinging Comeback". Retrieved 22 May 2006.

Further reading

Rugby league competitions in Queensland
Recurring sporting events established in 1948
1948 establishments in Australia
Sports leagues established in 1948
Rugby league trophies and awards